libuv is a multi-platform C library that provides support for asynchronous I/O based on event loops.  It supports epoll(4), kqueue(2), Windows IOCP, and Solaris event ports.  It is primarily designed for use in Node.js but it is also used by other software projects.  It was originally an abstraction around libev or Microsoft IOCP, as libev doesn't support IOCP on Windows.  In node-v0.9.0's version of libuv, the dependency on libev was removed.

Features
From:
 Full-featured event loop backed by epoll, kqueue, IOCP, event ports
 Asynchronous TCP and UDP sockets
 Asynchronous DNS resolution
 Asynchronous file and file system operations
 File system events
 ANSI escape code controlled TTY
 IPC with socket sharing, using Unix domain sockets or named pipes (Windows)
 Child processes
 Thread pool
 Signal handling
 High resolution clock
 Threading and synchronization primitives

Origin of the name 
According to libuv developer Ben Noordhuis, the name libuv originally had no specific naming, but as people kept asking about it, so they made something up. They came up with Unicorn Velociraptor, which became the logo of the library.

See also

 libevent
 libev
 Reactor pattern

References

External links
 
 
 An Introduction to libuv
 libuv API documentation
 libuv design overview

C (programming language) libraries
Events (computing)
Free computer libraries